Alkalibaculum is a genus in the phylum Bacillota (Bacteria).

Etymology
The name Alkalibaculum derives from:Arabic noun al-qaliy, the ashes of saltwort; New Latin noun alkali, alkali; Latin neuter gender noun baculum, stick; New Latin neuter gender noun Alkalibaculum, alkali stick.

Species
The genus contains a single species, namely A. bacchi ( Allen et al. 2010,  (Type species of the genus).; Latin genitive case noun bacchi, of Bacchus, Roman god of wine, referring to the production of ethanol by this organism.)

See also
 Bacterial taxonomy
 Microbiology

References 

Bacteria genera
Eubacteriaceae
Monotypic bacteria genera